FIDSA may refer to:

Fellow of the Industrial Designers Society of America
Fellow of the Infectious Diseases Society of America

Post-nominal letters